"Piece of My Heart" is a romantic soul love song written by Jerry Ragovoy and Bert Berns, originally recorded by Erma Franklin in 1967. Franklin's single peaked in December 1967 at number 10 on the Billboard Hot Rhythm & Blues Singles chart in the United States.

The song came to greater mainstream attention when Big Brother and the Holding Company (featuring Janis Joplin on lead vocals) covered the song in 1968 and had a much bigger hit with it, after which Franklin's version was nominated for the Grammy Award for Best Female R&B Vocal Performance. The song has since been remade by several singers, including Dusty Springfield also in 1968, Faith Hill in 1994 and duet version by Melissa Etheridge and Joss Stone in 2005.

In 2004, the Big Brother and the Holding Company version was ranked No. 353 on Rolling Stone list of the 500 Greatest Songs of All Time. The song is also included among The Rock and Roll Hall of Fame's 500 Songs that Shaped Rock and Roll.

Erma Franklin's original recording
The original version of "Piece of My Heart" was recorded by Aretha Franklin's older sister Erma in 1967 for producer Bert Berns' Shout label with the same song on both sides of the 7-inch vinyl single. Bert Berns wanted Van Morrison, whom he was producing at the time, to record the song, but Morrison declined, wanting to do his own material instead.

The song reached number 10 in December 1967 on the Billboard Hot Rhythm & Blues Singles chart in the United States and also peaked at number 62 on the Billboard Pop Singles chart. In Canada, it reached number three on the CKFH Soul Survey. Cash Box said  that it "starts with less volume than might be expected, which only emphasizes the build that follows."

Franklin's single was nominated for the Grammy Award for Best Female R&B Vocal Performance, the winner to be revealed in March 1969 at the 11th Annual Grammy Awards. The award went to Franklin's sister Aretha for the song "Chain of Fools".

In the United Kingdom and several other European countries, the single was re-released in 1992 due to being featured in a popular Levi's jeans commercial ("Cinderella" a.k.a. "Night and Day" directed by Tarsem Singh). The reissue peaked at number 5 in Denmark, number 9 in the Netherlands and the United Kingdom, and number 10 in Ireland.

Charts

Weekly charts

Year-end charts

Big Brother and the Holding Company version

The song became a bigger pop hit when recorded by Big Brother and the Holding Company in 1968 with lead singer Janis Joplin. The song was taken from the group's album Cheap Thrills, recorded in 1968 and released on Columbia Records. This four-minute, 15-second rendition made it to number 12 on the U.S. Billboard Hot 100 chart.  Billboard called it "dynamite," stating that "this raucous dance treatment will rock up the Hot 100."  Cash Box said that it is an "explosive performance" with a "power-packed Janis Joplin vocal" and also praised the backing band. The album release was the culmination of a hugely successful year for Joplin with acclaimed performances at the Monterey Pop Festival, Anderson Theater in New York, Wake For Martin Luther King Jr. (with Jimi Hendrix) in New York and on TV's prime-time The Dick Cavett Show.

The song's instrumentation was arranged by Sam Andrew, who also performed three distorted, loud guitar solos giving the song a psychedelic touch. The B-side was "Summertime". Another version had the B-side "Turtle Blues".

Franklin said in an interview that when she first heard Joplin's version on the radio, she did not recognize it because of the vocal arrangement. Noted cultural writer Ellen Willis wrote of the difference: "When Franklin sings it, it is a challenge: no matter what you do to me, I will not let you destroy my ability to be human, to love. Joplin seems rather to be saying, surely if I keep taking this, if I keep setting an example of love and forgiveness, surely he has to understand, change, give me back what I have given". In such a way, Joplin used blues conventions not to transcend pain, but "to scream it out of existence".

Until her death in 1970, "Piece of My Heart" was Joplin's biggest chart success and best-known song. ("Me and Bobby McGee”, which Kris Kristofferson wrote, eclipsed "Piece of My Heart" when it appeared after her death in 1970. It went to number 1 in 1971). "Piece of My Heart" remains most associated with Joplin and continued to get airplay long after her death. Berns never got to hear Joplin's version, dying of a heart attack on December 30, 1967.

Certifications

Faith Hill version

American country artist Faith Hill included the song on her debut album, Take Me as I Am (1993); her version reached No. 1 on the country charts in 1994. Hill's version took on a more passive tone coupled with traditional country instrumentation. Prior to recording the track, Hill had no knowledge of the song, especially Joplin's rendition. As a direct result, Hill's producers refused to allow her to listen to the Joplin version until she had completed her own recording. 

Hill re-recorded the track for the soundtrack to the television series King of the Hill, released in 1999. This edgier version can also be found on the 1998 international pressing of her third album, Faith (re-titled "Love Will Always Win" outside the U.S.) and 2001 international greatest hits album There You'll Be. Her original version was included in her 2007 compilation album The Hits.

Critical reception
Cyndi Hoelzle and Lisa Smith from the Gavin Report wrote, "How long did it take you to recognize this song? Faith takes Janis Joplin's classic (actually a 1968 hit for her band Big Brother and The Holding Company) and transforms it into a driving countrified lament."

Charts

Weekly charts

Year-end charts

Shaggy version

Jamaican-American reggae artist Shaggy covered the song on his self-produced and fourth album, Midnite Lover (1997). The single featuring Marsha was a top 10 hit in Italy, New Zealand and the United Kingdom, peaking at number 4, 6 and 7, respectively.

Critical reception
British magazine Music Week rated this version three out of five, adding, "Shaggy's fast-paced vocals get somewhat overshadowed by the smooth, silky presence of Marsha on this unadventurous remake of the Erma Franklin hit." Alan Jones noted that "Shaggy returns in fine style", concluding that "the result is a summery and unique treat, with the Shagmeister's verses interspersed by a fine femme vocalist—credited as Erma herself in sample form, though definitely not."

Charts

Melissa Etheridge and Joss Stone version
A live medley of this song with Janis Joplin and the Full Tilt Boogie Band's 1971 song "Cry Baby" became a hit duet for American rock singer Melissa Etheridge and English soul singer Joss Stone when it was released to iTunes Store after they performed it at the 47th Grammy Awards on February 13, 2005, in tribute to Joplin. She had previously sung it at Woodstock '94 as part of a four-song medley of Joplin tunes.

Etheridge's medley with Joss Stone made number 32 in the Billboard Hot 100 and number 2 on the Hot Digital Tracks in April 2005. The performance also signaled Etheridge's first public return from her battle with breast cancer; appearing with her head bald from the effects of chemotherapy. Etheridge also recorded a solo version of "Piece of My Heart" on her 2005 greatest hits album Greatest Hits: The Road Less Traveled.

Beverley Knight version

On her 2005 Affirmation Tour, English soul singer Beverley Knight performed the song with Ronnie Wood, which encouraged her to make a studio recording of the song. "Piece of My Heart" was the lead single from her 2006 best-of compilation Voice - The Best of Beverley Knight. It peaked inside the top 10 of the UK radio airplay chart. The physical single was released on March 13, 2006.

Due to a change in the UK chart rules which allowed singles to chart purely on downloads a week before their physical release, "Piece of My Heart" entered the UK chart at number 93, becoming one of the first singles to do so. It peaked at number 16 after its physical commercial release. It was Knight's first single to be released as a DVD. It is her longest-running single to date on the UK Singles Chart, spending 11 weeks inside the top 75. It was her thirteenth top 40 entry and her seventh top-20 hit on the UK Singles Chart.

Personnel
 Beverley Knight – lead vocals
 Bryan Chambers, Billie Godfrey, Louise Marshall – backing vocals
 Martin Slatterty – Wurlitzer organ, Hammond organ 
 Sam Dixon – bass
 Jeremy Stacey – drums 
 Jimmy Hogarth – guitars, percussion
 Jimmy Hogarth – producer
 Pom (Pierre-Olivier Magerand) – engineer
 Phillip Bodger – mixer

Charts

Other recordings
 Etta James, on her 1978 album Deep in the Night. Released as a single, it reached #93 on the Billboard Hot Soul Singles chart.
 Sammy Hagar, on his 1982 album Standing Hampton. Released as a single, it became a minor hit, reaching number 73 on the Billboard Hot 100 and number 67 on the UK Singles Chart.
 Tiffany Haddish, in the 2021 film Here Today.

References

1967 songs
1967 singles
1968 singles
1982 singles
1994 singles
1997 singles
2005 singles
2006 singles
Beverley Knight songs
Erma Franklin songs
Etta James songs
Faith Hill songs
Jenny Morris (musician) songs
Janis Joplin songs
Joss Stone songs
Melissa Etheridge songs
Sammy Hagar songs
Shaggy (musician) songs
Songs written by Bert Berns
Songs written by Jerry Ragovoy
Song recordings produced by Scott Hendricks
Song recordings produced by John Simon (record producer)
Music videos directed by Deaton-Flanigen Productions
Grammy Hall of Fame Award recipients
Columbia Records singles
Parlophone singles
Shout Records singles
Warner Records Nashville singles
Virgin Records singles
Country ballads
Rhythm and blues ballads
Soul ballads
Male–female vocal duets
Big Brother and the Holding Company songs